The 2011 TPG Tour was the fifth season of the TPG Tour, the main professional golf tour in Argentina since it was established in 2007.

Schedule
The following table lists official events during the 2011 season.

Order of Merit
The Order of Merit was based on prize money won during the season, calculated using a points-based system.

Notes

References

TPG Tour
TPG Tour